Gounaropoulos Museum is located in Athens, Greece. Founded in 1979, it belongs to the municipality of Zografou and aims to present and promote the work of the painter Giorgos Gounaropoulos.
The museum is housed in the artist's home and atelier, and contains 40 oil paintings and drawings, the artist's personal belongings and archive. Guided tours and educational programs are offered, and a variety of art exhibitions, lectures and other cultural events are hosted.

External links
Official site
City of Athens
Hellenic Ministry of Culture and Tourism

Museums in Athens
Art museums and galleries in Greece
Historic house museums in Greece
Art museums established in 1977
1977 establishments in Greece